Brighton Sinyangwe  was Zambian footballer who plays as a forward. He played for Zambia in the Africa Cup of Nations in 1974 and 1978.

He played club football for Mindola United and Rhokana United.

References

External links

11v11 Profile

Zambian footballers
Zambia international footballers
1974 African Cup of Nations players
1978 African Cup of Nations players
Place of birth missing (living people)
Year of birth missing (living people)
Living people
Association football forwards
Nkana F.C. players